Helge Iberg (born 27 March 1954 in Skien, Norway) is a Norwegian contemporary composer. 
Iberg studied musicology, history of ideas and religious studies at the University of Oslo under the tutorship of composers Olav Anton Thommessen and Ragnar Søderlind.

As a composer, Iberg has made the transition from jazz to contemporary orchestral music. Iberg’s works have been commissioned and performed by several of Norway’s major symphony orchestras, the Norwegian Chamber Orchestra, Ultima Oslo Contemporary Music Festival and the Oslo Chamber Music Festival.

Iberg is a recipient of a Prix Italia Work of the Year Award for his opera Det ondes problem (1990) as well as nominations to the Edvardprisen and the  Spellemannprisen – the Norwegian equivalent to the Grammy. Iberg has composed concertos for pianist Christian Ihle Hadland, trumpeter Ole Edvard Antonsen as well as violinists Terje Tønnesen and Atle Sponberg. Iberg has also penned song cycles for vocalists Per Vollestad and Marianne Beate Kielland.

Iberg is also active as a jazz pianist and has collaborated with such performers as Bendik Hofseth, Sidsel Endresen and Knut Riisnæs.

Production

Selected works
 Bloom : 'Triptych for Piano and Symphony Orchestra (2014)
 Liebes-Kleine-Lieder (2012)
 Banquet at Tao's Pavilion (2011)
 Sanger fra Livets Jord (2011)
 Sinfonia di Calcio : Fussballerische musik (2009)
 Tale of Sorrowful Song (2008)
 - er vi ikke alle krigere i vårt eget liv?  (2008)
 ...kjenner vingen hakke (2008)
 Dromo-Dance : For solo violin and string orchestra (2004)
  (e) X (nihilo)  (2000)
 Håkon : Et oratorium av Haakon Den Godes livsskjebne (1995)
 Det ondes magt : Fritt etter Barbereren fra Valebø : Et sosialdemokratisk gesimskunstverk (1990)

Discography
 Solo albums
 1991: Det ondes problem etc.: (Et sosialdarwinistisk gesimskunstverk)  (Norsk Plateproduksjon)
 1997: Never Ending West Side Story (Kirkelig Kulturverksted)
 2007: ReHumaniZing (Aurora)
 2017: Jazzkammer (Odin Records)

 Collaborations
 1992:  Alice Lengter Tilbake (Norsk Lyd), audiobook with Tor Åge Bringsværd
 1997: Ludo (Kirkelig Kulturverksted), with Bendik Hofseth, Anne-Lise Berntsen
 2000: Halvveis (Curling Legs), with Per Vollestad, Odd Børretzen, lyrics by Rolf Jacobsen
 2009: Standards and Vanguards (Grappa Music), with Elin Rosseland

References

External links
 List of works supplied by the National Library of Norway	

1954 births
Living people
Norwegian classical composers
20th-century classical composers
21st-century classical composers
Norwegian male classical composers
20th-century Norwegian male musicians
21st-century Norwegian male musicians
Musicians from Skien